Óscar Melendo Jiménez (born 23 August 1997) is a Spanish professional footballer who plays as a right winger for Granada CF.

Club career

Espanyol
Born in Barcelona, Catalonia, Melendo joined RCD Espanyol's youth setup in 2003, aged six. On 8 June 2016, he was promoted to the reserves in the Segunda División B, and signed a three-year deal with the club on 20 July.

Melendo appeared in his first professional match on 20 August 2016, starting in a 1–1 away draw against UE Llagostera. He made his first-team – and La Liga – debut on 20 November, coming on as a second-half substitute for Hernán Pérez in the 1–0 away victory over Deportivo Alavés.

On 1 February 2017, Melendo renewed his contract until 2022 and was definitely promoted to the main squad ahead of the 2017–18 season. On 17 January of the following year, he scored a late winner to help the hosts defeat FC Barcelona 1–0 in the first leg of the quarter-finals of the Copa del Rey.

Melendo left Espanyol on 30 June 2022 as his contract was expiring, after failing to reach an agreement for a renewal. He played a total of 161 games, scoring six goals.

Granada
On 6 August 2022, Melendo signed a one-year deal with Granada CF, recently relegated to the Segunda División.

International career
On 20 March 2019, Melendo was called up by Catalonia for a friendly against Venezuela. Five days later, he started in the 2–1 win at the Estadi Montilivi.

Career statistics

Honours
Espanyol
Segunda División: 2020–21

References

External links

1997 births
Living people
Spanish footballers
Footballers from Barcelona
Association football wingers
La Liga players
Segunda División players
Segunda División B players
RCD Espanyol B footballers
RCD Espanyol footballers
Granada CF footballers
Catalonia international footballers